Asymphorodes dimorpha is a species of gelechioid moth of subfamily Agonoxeninae of the palm moth family (Agonoxenidae), whose taxonomic status is disputed. Alternatively, the palm moths might be a subfamily of the grass-miner moth family (Elachistidae), with the Agonoxeninae becoming a tribe Agonoxenini.

Formerly, this genus was included in the cosmet moths (Cosmopterigidae). It is found in Niihau, Kauai, Oahu, Molokai, Maui, Lanai, Hawaii, Nihoa, Necker Island, Pearl and Hermes Atoll, Midway Atoll, Kure Atoll, Wake Island, Kanton Island and Jarvis Island, but is probably much more widely distributed in the Pacific.

The wings are folded at rest and the moth appears brown on the sides with a broad, pale, longitudinal stripe down the middle of the back. The hindwing of the male is most unusual. Not only is the venation much reduced, but there is a singular, bladderlike, thorn-bearing protuberance near the middle of the hind margin of the cell near the wing margin. Part of this organ projects above the dorsal wing surface, but the greatest protuberance is from the ventral surface.

Larvae have been recorded feeding on dead leaves, dead grass and dead plant materials in turf. The larvae are whitish and do not make cases.

References

External links

Agonoxeninae
Endemic moths of Hawaii